Petra Kvitová was the defending champion, and successfully defended her title, defeating compatriot and fourth seed Lucie Šafářová in the final 6–7(6–8), 6–2, 6–2.

Seeds
The top two seeds received a bye into the second round.

Draw

Finals

Top half

Bottom half

Qualifying

Seeds

Qualifiers

Lucky loser
  Lesia Tsurenko

Draw

First qualifier

Second qualifier

Third qualifier

Fourth qualifier

Fifth qualifier

Sixth qualifier

External links
 WTA tournament draws

Singles